Shawvers Crossing is an unincorporated community in Greenbrier County, West Virginia, United States. Shawvers Crossing is located on U.S. Route 60, southeast of Rupert.

Shawver most likely is a corruption of Schaeffer.

References

Unincorporated communities in Greenbrier County, West Virginia
Unincorporated communities in West Virginia